Howard Lowell Biddulph (28 March 1935 - 23 May 2022) born in Rexburg, Idaho, was a political scientist whose work focused on the government of the Soviet Union. At various times, he was a faculty member at Brigham Young University (BYU), University of Victoria, and Rutgers University.

As a young man Biddulph served as a Mormon missionary in the Canadian mission, based in Toronto and covering eastern Canada from 1955 to 1957. He earned his bachelor's degree at BYU and received his master's degree and Ph.D. from Indiana University, where he wrote his dissertation on "Karl Marx's Early Thought in the Soviet Union". Biddulph began his academic career as a professor at Rutgers University.  He was chair of the political science department at the University of Victoria. After his time as mission president Biddulph was a professor at BYU. In that position he led many study abroad tours to Ukraine.

Biddulph was the first president of the Victoria British Columbia Stake of the Church of Jesus Christ of Latter-day Saints (LDS Church) and the first president of the church's Ukraine Kiev Mission, where he oversaw the opening of missionary work in Ukraine. In the LDS Church, Biddulph has also been a bishop, counselor in a mission presidency and Regional Representative of the Quorum of the Twelve among several other calling in the church.

Biddulph and his wife Colleen are the parents of five children.

Biddulph also wrote the book The Morning Breaks (Salt Lake City: Deseret Book, 1996).  Articles by Biddulph include the 1983 article "Local Interest Articulation at CPSU Congress",  "Soviet Intellectual Dissent as a Political Counter Culture" in Western Political Quarterly, Vol. 25, No. 3, p. 522-533, "Religious Liberty and the Ukrainian State: Nationalism Versus Equal Protection" in BYU Law Review, 1995 and "Religious Participation of Youth in the USSR" in Europe-Asia Studies, Vol. 31, Issue 3 (July 1979) p. 417-433.

References

 
Church News country information for Ukraine
Robert J. McCue, "The Saints on Vancouver Island", Ensign, April 1976, p. 45.
Deseret News Church Almanac. 2010 edition. p. 447.
All Books entry of Biddulph
list of useful primary sources including Biddulph's book
Global Mormonism Project entry on Ukraine

1930s births
Brigham Young University faculty
Canadian leaders of the Church of Jesus Christ of Latter-day Saints
Canadian Mormon missionaries
Brigham Young University alumni
Indiana University alumni
Living people
Mission presidents (LDS Church)
Mormon missionaries in Ukraine
Regional representatives of the Twelve
Rutgers University faculty
Academic staff of the University of Victoria
Year of birth missing (living people)
Canadian expatriates in Ukraine
Canadian Latter Day Saint writers
Latter Day Saints from New Jersey
American emigrants to Canada